Kanyaka is a Malayalam magazine from India which primarily addresses women's issues. It is a fortnightly magazine published by Mangalam Publications India Pvt. Ltd., Kottayam. Claramma Varghese is Chief Editor and Toshma Biju Varghese is the Managing Editor. Sajil Sreedhar is the Editor-In-Chief. The magazine's headquarters are in Mumbai.

The magazine contains features on current affairs, stories, poems, cartoons, interviews of celebrities and uncelebrated common personalities. The magazine is dedicated to the uplifting women in Indian society as well as in the societies of other countries.

Contents

Kanyaka publishes recipes from chefs, beauty tips from Indian beauticians, and health care tips from doctors and dieticians. It also contains relationship advice for married couples and a family guide in every issue.

Contests 
Kanyaka has been the official media partner of pageants like Miss South India, Miss Queen of India and Miss Asia worldwide, organised by Pegasus Event Makers. 

Kanyaka conducted a Film Award to commemorate its 30th year at Kochi, adopting the theme of "celebrating youth in Malayalam cinema". The award winners were Prithwiraj, Asif Ali, Indrajith, Anoop Menon, Kavya Madhavan, Samvrutha Sunil, Rima Kallingal and Remya Nambeesan.

Kanyaka has conducted three seasons of the Kitchen Queen Cookery contest among women readers across the state, with the most recent iteration featuring Padmashree Mohanlal as the chief guest. 

Kanyaka also conducted a climax contest for its novel series, Ee Kaikkumbilil, among its readers, the first of its kind in the state.

Readership profile

Kanyaka is the leading women's magazine in Malayalam. It is mainly read by the people in the 18–35 age group. It is the third largest circulated women's fortnightly magazine in the lifestyle segment in Malayalam, which successfully completed its 33rd year of existence.

Staff

Claramma Varghese, the wife of M.C. Varghese is the Chief Editor and Toshma Biju Varghese is the Managing editor of Kanyaka Malayalam. The editorial team is headed by Sajil Sreedhar. G. Vipinkumar is the chief photographer. Biju Andrews is the page layout artist.

References

External links
 

Biweekly magazines published in India
Women's magazines published in India
Magazines with year of establishment missing
Malayalam-language magazines
Mass media in Mumbai
Year of establishment missing